The Braille pattern dots-4 is a 6-dot or 8-dot braille cell with the top right dot raised. It is represented by the Unicode code point U+2808, and in Braille ASCII with the "at" sign: @.

Unified Braille

In unified international braille, the braille pattern dots-4 is used as a formatting indicator, accent mark, or punctuation.

Table of unified braille values

Other braille

Plus dots 7 and 8

Related to Braille pattern dots-4 are Braille patterns 47, 48, and 478, which are used in 8-dot braille systems, such as Gardner-Salinas and Luxembourgish Braille.

Related 8-dot kantenji patterns

In the Japanese kantenji braille, the standard 8-dot Braille patterns 5, 15, 45, and 145 are the patterns related to Braille pattern dots-4, since the two additional dots of kantenji patterns 04, 47, and 047 are placed above the base 6-dot cell, instead of below, as in standard 8-dot braille.

Kantenji using braille patterns 5, 15, 45, or 145

This listing includes kantenji using Braille pattern dots-4 for all 6349 kanji found in JIS C 6226-1978.

  - N/A - used only as a selector

Selector

  -  宿 + selector 4  =  与
  -  宿 + 宿 + selector 4  =  與
  -  や/疒 + 宿 + selector 4  =  嶼
  -  ん/止 + 宿 + selector 4  =  歟
  -  く/艹 + selector 4  =  丘
  -  む/車 + く/艹 + selector 4  =  蚯
  -  さ/阝 + く/艹 + selector 4  =  邱
  -  そ/馬 + く/艹 + selector 4  =  駈
  -  ち/竹 + selector 4  =  両
  -  ち/竹 + selector 4 + い/糹/#2  =  霍
  -  ち/竹 + selector 4 + 火  =  霏
  -  ち/竹 + ち/竹 + selector 4  =  兩
  -  な/亻 + ち/竹 + selector 4  =  倆
  -  ね/示 + ち/竹 + selector 4  =  裲
  -  む/車 + ち/竹 + selector 4  =  輛
  -  お/頁 + ち/竹 + selector 4  =  魎
  -  ふ/女 + selector 4  =  丹
  -  ほ/方 + ふ/女 + selector 4  =  旃
  -  心 + ふ/女 + selector 4  =  栴
  -  た/⽥ + selector 4  =  由
  -  ふ/女 + た/⽥ + selector 4  =  舳
  -  や/疒 + た/⽥ + selector 4  =  岫
  -  は/辶 + た/⽥ + selector 4  =  廸
  -  心 + た/⽥ + selector 4  =  柚
  -  い/糹/#2 + た/⽥ + selector 4  =  紬
  -  む/車 + た/⽥ + selector 4  =  蚰
  -  ひ/辶 + た/⽥ + selector 4  =  迪
  -  の/禾 + た/⽥ + selector 4  =  釉
  -  そ/馬 + た/⽥ + selector 4  =  騁
  -  す/発 + selector 4  =  久
  -  す/発 + selector 4 + selector 4  =  夂
  -  か/金 + す/発 + selector 4  =  鑁
  -  き/木 + す/発 + selector 4  =  柩
  -  へ/⺩ + す/発 + selector 4  =  玖
  -  や/疒 + す/発 + selector 4  =  疚
  -  そ/馬 + selector 4  =  午
  -  る/忄 + そ/馬 + selector 4  =  忤
  -  き/木 + そ/馬 + selector 4  =  杵
  -  selector 4 + selector 4 + そ/馬  =  彖
  -  れ/口 + selector 4  =  味
  -  つ/土 + selector 4  =  域
  -  う/宀/#3 + selector 4  =  宙
  -  selector 4 + selector 4 + う/宀/#3  =  彡
  -  か/金 + selector 4  =  州
  -  に/氵 + か/金 + selector 4  =  洲
  -  そ/馬 + か/金 + selector 4  =  駲
  -  ゐ/幺 + selector 4  =  幻
  -  ゆ/彳 + selector 4  =  引
  -  や/疒 + ゆ/彳 + selector 4  =  矧
  -  む/車 + ゆ/彳 + selector 4  =  蚓
  -  囗 + selector 4  =  或
  -  も/門 + 囗 + selector 4  =  閾
  -  ろ/十 + selector 4  =  才
  -  け/犬 + ろ/十 + selector 4  =  犲
  -  日 + selector 4  =  旧
  -  日 + 日 + selector 4  =  舊
  -  て/扌 + selector 4  =  抽
  -  き/木 + selector 4  =  未
  -  う/宀/#3 + き/木 + selector 4  =  寐
  -  日 + き/木 + selector 4  =  昧
  -  め/目 + き/木 + selector 4  =  眛
  -  比 + selector 4  =  此
  -  れ/口 + 比 + selector 4  =  呰
  -  や/疒 + 比 + selector 4  =  疵
  -  め/目 + 比 + selector 4  =  眦
  -  囗 + 比 + selector 4  =  觜
  -  を/貝 + 比 + selector 4  =  貲
  -  氷/氵 + selector 4  =  永
  -  れ/口 + 氷/氵 + selector 4  =  咏
  -  る/忄 + 氷/氵 + selector 4  =  怺
  -  日 + 氷/氵 + selector 4  =  昶
  -  ⺼ + 氷/氵 + selector 4  =  脉
  -  に/氵 + selector 4  =  泳
  -  の/禾 + selector 4  =  稲
  -  の/禾 + の/禾 + selector 4  =  稻
  -  ね/示 + selector 4  =  袖
  -  ゑ/訁 + selector 4  =  詠
  -  は/辶 + selector 4  =  赱
  -  ひ/辶 + selector 4  =  道
  -  せ/食 + selector 4  =  酸
  -  め/目 + selector 4  =  面
  -  に/氵 + め/目 + selector 4  =  湎
  -  い/糹/#2 + め/目 + selector 4  =  緬
  -  よ/广 + め/目 + selector 4  =  靨
  -  す/発 + め/目 + selector 4  =  麺
  -  お/頁 + selector 4  =  首
  -  囗 + お/頁 + selector 4  =  馘
  -  け/犬 + selector 4  =  鼬
  -  selector 4 + ふ/女  =  不
  -  つ/土 + selector 4 + ふ/女  =  坏
  -  て/扌 + selector 4 + ふ/女  =  抔
  -  す/発 + selector 4 + ふ/女  =  罘
  -  ⺼ + selector 4 + ふ/女  =  胚
  -  selector 4 + や/疒  =  乎
  -  selector 4 + ち/竹  =  也
  -  か/金 + selector 4 + ち/竹  =  釶
  -  と/戸 + selector 4 + ち/竹  =  髢
  -  selector 4 + ま/石  =  了
  -  selector 4 + よ/广  =  予
  -  て/扌 + selector 4 + よ/广  =  抒
  -  き/木 + selector 4 + よ/广  =  杼
  -  り/分 + selector 4 + よ/广  =  舒
  -  selector 4 + selector 4 + よ/广  =  豫
  -  selector 4 + selector 4 + よ/广  =  豫
  -  selector 4 + え/訁  =  亦
  -  selector 4 + も/門  =  以
  -  心 + selector 4 + も/門  =  苡
  -  selector 4 + 宿  =  儿
  -  selector 4 + こ/子  =  共
  -  れ/口 + selector 4 + こ/子  =  哄
  -  て/扌 + selector 4 + こ/子  =  拱
  -  に/氵 + selector 4 + こ/子  =  洪
  -  む/車 + selector 4 + こ/子  =  蛬
  -  selector 4 + き/木  =  其
  -  に/氵 + selector 4 + き/木  =  淇
  -  ね/示 + selector 4 + き/木  =  祺
  -  の/禾 + selector 4 + き/木  =  稘
  -  ち/竹 + selector 4 + き/木  =  箕
  -  そ/馬 + selector 4 + き/木  =  騏
  -  selector 4 + へ/⺩  =  冊
  -  selector 4 + selector 4 + へ/⺩  =  册
  -  selector 4 + 龸  =  凡
  -  き/木 + selector 4 + 龸  =  梵
  -  に/氵 + selector 4 + 龸  =  汎
  -  selector 4 + ぬ/力  =  刀
  -  れ/口 + selector 4 + ぬ/力  =  叨
  -  や/疒 + selector 4 + ぬ/力  =  屶
  -  て/扌 + selector 4 + ぬ/力  =  挈
  -  き/木 + selector 4 + ぬ/力  =  朷
  -  心 + selector 4 + ぬ/力  =  茘
  -  か/金 + selector 4 + ぬ/力  =  釖
  -  selector 4 + ね/示  =  剣
  -  selector 1 + selector 4 + ね/示  =  剱
  -  selector 4 + selector 4 + ね/示  =  劍
  -  selector 6 + selector 4 + ね/示  =  劒
  -  selector 5 + selector 4 + ね/示  =  劔
  -  selector 4 + 数  =  勿
  -  ぬ/力 + selector 4 + 数  =  刎
  -  日 + selector 4 + 数  =  昜
  -  ち/竹 + selector 4 + 数  =  笏
  -  selector 4 + さ/阝  =  印
  -  selector 4 + ゑ/訁  =  又
  -  う/宀/#3 + selector 4 + ゑ/訁  =  攴
  -  火 + selector 4 + ゑ/訁  =  燮
  -  selector 4 + ゐ/幺  =  及
  -  や/疒 + selector 4 + ゐ/幺  =  岌
  -  に/氵 + selector 4 + ゐ/幺  =  汲
  -  ち/竹 + selector 4 + ゐ/幺  =  笈
  -  selector 4 + な/亻  =  台
  -  る/忄 + selector 4 + な/亻  =  怡
  -  ち/竹 + selector 4 + な/亻  =  笞
  -  い/糹/#2 + selector 4 + な/亻  =  紿
  -  え/訁 + selector 4 + な/亻  =  詒
  -  を/貝 + selector 4 + な/亻  =  貽
  -  そ/馬 + selector 4 + な/亻  =  駘
  -  selector 4 + selector 4 + な/亻  =  臺
  -  て/扌 + selector 4 + な/亻  =  擡
  -  く/艹 + selector 4 + な/亻  =  薹
  -  selector 4 + selector 4 + な/亻  =  臺
  -  selector 4 + 仁/亻  =  司
  -  ち/竹 + selector 4 + 仁/亻  =  笥
  -  selector 4 + selector 4 + 仁/亻  =  旡
  -  selector 4 + み/耳  =  哉
  -  selector 4 + け/犬  =  夭
  -  selector 4 + て/扌  =  専
  -  selector 4 + selector 4 + て/扌  =  專
  -  て/扌 + selector 4 + て/扌  =  摶
  -  き/木 + selector 4 + て/扌  =  槫
  -  ま/石 + selector 4 + て/扌  =  磚
  -  か/金 + selector 4 + て/扌  =  甎
  -  心 + selector 4 + て/扌  =  榑
  -  に/氵 + selector 4 + て/扌  =  溥
  -  を/貝 + selector 4 + て/扌  =  賻
  -  selector 4 + か/金  =  干
  -  日 + selector 4 + か/金  =  旱
  -  て/扌 + selector 4 + か/金  =  捍
  -  の/禾 + selector 4 + か/金  =  稈
  -  き/木 + selector 4 + か/金  =  栞
  -  す/発 + selector 4 + か/金  =  罕
  -  selector 4 + つ/土  =  庄
  -  selector 4 + selector 4 + つ/土  =  甬
  -  を/貝 + selector 4 + つ/土  =  賍
  -  selector 4 + 囗  =  戈
  -  を/貝 + selector 4 + 囗  =  戝
  -  ろ/十 + selector 4 + 囗  =  戟
  -  む/車 + selector 4 + 囗  =  戮
  -  や/疒 + selector 4 + 囗  =  戳
  -  て/扌 + selector 4 + 囗  =  找
  -  き/木 + selector 4 + 囗  =  棧
  -  ち/竹 + selector 4 + 囗  =  箋
  -  selector 4 + 囗 + い/糹/#2  =  貮
  -  selector 4 + 氷/氵  =  改
  -  selector 4 + selector 4 + 氷/氵  =  攵
  -  selector 4 + ほ/方  =  旁
  -  心 + selector 4 + ほ/方  =  蒡
  -  selector 4 + 日  =  旦
  -  つ/土 + selector 4 + 日  =  坦
  -  ふ/女 + selector 4 + 日  =  妲
  -  る/忄 + selector 4 + 日  =  怛
  -  や/疒 + selector 4 + 日  =  疸
  -  ね/示 + selector 4 + 日  =  袒
  -  と/戸 + selector 4 + 日  =  靼
  -  selector 4 + に/氵  =  旨
  -  と/戸 + selector 4 + に/氵  =  耆
  -  selector 4 + そ/馬  =  曽
  -  selector 4 + の/禾  =  段
  -  selector 4 + selector 4 + の/禾  =  殳
  -  き/木 + selector 4 + の/禾  =  椴
  -  い/糹/#2 + selector 4 + の/禾  =  緞
  -  心 + selector 4 + の/禾  =  葮
  -  selector 4 + せ/食  =  毛
  -  ほ/方 + selector 4 + せ/食  =  旄
  -  せ/食 + selector 4 + せ/食  =  毳
  -  囗 + selector 4 + せ/食  =  氈
  -  か/金 + selector 4 + せ/食  =  瓱
  -  と/戸 + selector 4 + せ/食  =  耄
  -  ま/石 + selector 4 + せ/食  =  麾
  -  selector 4 + せ/食 + selector 1  =  鳫
  -  selector 4 + め/目  =  牙
  -  れ/口 + selector 4 + め/目  =  呀
  -  selector 4 + る/忄  =  甘
  -  つ/土 + selector 4 + る/忄  =  坩
  -  て/扌 + selector 4 + る/忄  =  拑
  -  心 + selector 4 + る/忄  =  柑
  -  龸 + selector 4 + る/忄  =  甞
  -  や/疒 + selector 4 + る/忄  =  疳
  -  ち/竹 + selector 4 + る/忄  =  箝
  -  む/車 + selector 4 + る/忄  =  蚶
  -  さ/阝 + selector 4 + る/忄  =  邯
  -  せ/食 + selector 4 + る/忄  =  酣
  -  か/金 + selector 4 + る/忄  =  鉗
  -  selector 4 + ひ/辶  =  皮
  -  つ/土 + selector 4 + ひ/辶  =  坡
  -  て/扌 + selector 4 + ひ/辶  =  披
  -  へ/⺩ + selector 4 + ひ/辶  =  玻
  -  む/車 + selector 4 + ひ/辶  =  皴
  -  宿 + selector 4 + ひ/辶  =  皸
  -  も/門 + selector 4 + ひ/辶  =  皺
  -  ち/竹 + selector 4 + ひ/辶  =  簸
  -  さ/阝 + selector 4 + ひ/辶  =  陂
  -  と/戸 + selector 4 + ひ/辶  =  鞁
  -  selector 4 + ⺼  =  皿
  -  ふ/女 + selector 4 + ⺼  =  盃
  -  selector 4 + ん/止  =  缶
  -  selector 4 + す/発  =  臣
  -  う/宀/#3 + selector 4 + す/発  =  宦
  -  selector 4 + ゆ/彳  =  至
  -  れ/口 + selector 4 + ゆ/彳  =  咥
  -  つ/土 + selector 4 + ゆ/彳  =  垤
  -  ふ/女 + selector 4 + ゆ/彳  =  姪
  -  き/木 + selector 4 + ゆ/彳  =  桎
  -  と/戸 + selector 4 + ゆ/彳  =  耋
  -  む/車 + selector 4 + ゆ/彳  =  蛭
  -  selector 4 + selector 4 + ゆ/彳  =  隶
  -  selector 4 + む/車  =  蜀
  -  み/耳 + selector 4 + む/車  =  躅
  -  selector 4 + ろ/十  =  辰
  -  う/宀/#3 + selector 4 + ろ/十  =  宸
  -  日 + selector 4 + ろ/十  =  晨
  -  ⺼ + selector 4 + ろ/十  =  脣
  -  selector 4 + と/戸  =  長
  -  る/忄 + selector 4 + と/戸  =  悵
  -  心 + selector 4 + と/戸  =  萇
  -  selector 4 + い/糹/#2  =  離
  -  に/氵 + selector 4 + い/糹/#2  =  漓
  -  へ/⺩ + selector 4 + い/糹/#2  =  璃
  -  お/頁 + selector 4 + い/糹/#2  =  魑
  -  の/禾 + selector 4 + い/糹/#2  =  黐
  -  selector 4 + selector 4 + い/糹/#2  =  隹
  -  う/宀/#3 + selector 4 + い/糹/#2  =  寉
  -  囗 + selector 4 + い/糹/#2  =  雕
  -  selector 4 + 火  =  非
  -  も/門 + selector 4 + 火  =  匪
  -  と/戸 + selector 4 + 火  =  扉
  -  日 + selector 4 + 火  =  暃
  -  へ/⺩ + selector 4 + 火  =  琲
  -  ⺼ + selector 4 + 火  =  腓
  -  心 + selector 4 + 火  =  菲
  -  む/車 + selector 4 + 火  =  蜚
  -  ね/示 + selector 4 + 火  =  裴
  -  せ/食 + selector 4 + 火  =  鯡
  -  龸 + selector 4 + 火  =  韭
  -  さ/阝 + selector 4 + 火  =  齏
  -  龸 + selector 4 + く/艹  =  毓
  -  selector 4 + へ/⺩ + に/氵  =  毬
  -  selector 4 + へ/⺩ + 比  =  獎
  -  て/扌 + の/禾 + selector 4  =  秉
  -  selector 4 + む/車 + う/宀/#3  =  軣
  -  selector 4 + む/車 + と/戸  =  辧

Notes

Braille patterns